Feijó is a municipality located in the center of the Brazilian state of Acre. As of 2020, its population was 34,884. The total land area is 24,202 km².

The city is served by Feijó Airport.

The municipality contains the  Santa Rosa do Purus National Forest, a sustainable use conservation unit created  in 2001.

References 

Municipalities in Acre (state)